Andrew was a Hungarian prelate in the 11th century, who served as Bishop of Veszprém  sometime between 1062 and 1081. His life and activities are unknown, his name is only preserved by several settlement and geographical names throughout in the region on the north shore of Lake Balaton in the territory of the diocese.

Presence in sources
His name is not appeared in chronicles nor list of dignitaries of contemporary diplomas. A land register of the Bakonybél Abbey from 1086 mentions Andrew donated one of the estates ("villa Andree episcopi") to the monastery prior to that. Archaeologist Endre Tóth identified this village with Endréd (Endre is an old Hungarian name variant of Andrew or András), present-day an uninhabited borough of Magyarpolány. Additionally, Andrew donated a portion in Földvár to the abbey. The nearby Balatonendréd – an estate of the cathedral chapter of Veszprém – also preserved the bishop's name. Plausibly he donated the land to the chapter. Andrew also possessed a lime kiln and a landholding named Endréd near the villages Márkó, Szentgál and Bánd.

Endre Tóth argued Andrew served as Bishop of Veszprém in the period between 1062 and 1081 (or 1079). A certain George is widely considered a bishop of Veszprém in 1061. Tóth claimed the first St. Michael's Cathedral in Veszprém was most probably built during Andrew's episcopate.

References

Sources 

 
 

Bishops of Veszprém
11th-century Hungarian people
11th-century Roman Catholic bishops in Hungary